Doni Adriansyah (born 22 November 2001) is an Indonesian professional footballer who plays as a defender.

Club career

Persikabo 1973
He was signed for Persikabo 1973 to play in the Liga 1 in the 2021 season. Doni made his league debut on 3 February 2022 in a match against Bali United at the Ngurah Rai Stadium, Denpasar.

Career statistics

Club

Notes

References

External links
 Doni Adriansyah at Soccerway
 Doni Adriansyah at Liga Indonesia

2001 births
Living people
Indonesian footballers
Persikabo 1973 players
Association football defenders
21st-century Indonesian people